The 1948 was the 8th season in Independiente Santa Fe's existence, and the club's 1st year in the Campeonato Profesional.

Players

First-team squad

Manager:  Carlos Carrillo

1 Kaor Dokú was able to register as Colombian by the nationality of his mother
2 Héctor Rial was registered as Argentinian by his place of birth, also he didn't have Spanish nationality at the time
Source: Golgolgol

Players statistics

Source: Golgolgol

Goalscorers

Disciplinary record

|-
|
|FW
|
|align=left|Jesús María Lires
|0
|0
|1
|

|-
|
|DF
|
|align=left|Oscar Bernau
|1
|0
|0
|

Competitions

Campeonato Profesional

Home-away summary

Home

Away

Match results

External links
RSSSF.com - Colombia 1948

Association football clubs 1948 season
Independiente Santa Fe
Independiente Santa Fe seasons